Richard Rose Central Academy is a coeducational secondary school and sixth form with academy status. It is located in Carlisle in the English county of Cumbria.

History

Grammar school
The school traces its roots to Carlisle & County High School for Girls (CCHS), which opened at 19 Castle Street in January 1884 for 36 girls. The site is now a bookshop. The school was a girls' grammar school. In 1909 a new site was built at Lismore Place for Carlisle High School. The school had houses of Netherby, Greystoke, Lanercost and Linstock.

In 1904 the school was transferred to Cumberland County Council and later became St Aidan's County High School, a co-educational comprehensive school. The school was a girls' grammar school for 86 years until 1970.

Academy
In September 2008, St Aidan's County High School and the North Cumbria Technology College (formerly Harraby School) merged to form Richard Rose Central Academy. The school was subsequently rebuilt on the former St Aidan's site in 2010, costing £31m. The academy was first sponsored by Eddie Stobart owner Andrew Tinkler and local businessman Brian Scowcroft.

Protests
In January 2009, there were protests by parents and pupils regarding poor quality education and school facilities. The school was found to be inadequate by Ofsted and was placed in special measures, with the headmaster and chief executive being immediately replaced.

Ofsted judgements
The Academy is now rated as Good by Ofsted.

Federation
Since September 2014 Richard Rose Central Academy is sponsored by United Learning. The school is in a federation with Richard Rose Morton Academy and the schools share a sixth form. The sixth form offers students the option to study from a range of A-levels, BTECs and vocational courses as programmes of study.

Notable former pupils

 Matthew Pagan, Member of Britain's Got Talent winners Collabro

St Aidan's County High School
 Helen Grant (nee Okuboye), Conservative MP since 2010 for Maidstone and The Weald (succeeding Ann Widdecombe), captain of the school's hockey and tennis teams
 Mike Freer, Conservative MP since 2010 for Finchley and Golders Green (former seat of Margaret Thatcher until 1992), and the Conservative leader from 2006-09 of Barnet London Borough Council

Carlisle & County High School for Girls
 Liz Blackman, Labour MP from 1997-2010 for Erewash
 Beatrix Campbell OBE (nee Barnes), feminist writer
 Margaret Forster, author
 Patricia Langham CBE (nee Lowrie), Headmistress from 1987-2009 of Wakefield Girls' High School, and President in 2007 of the Girls' Schools Association
 Jancis Robinson OBE (head girl), wine critic

References

External links
 Richard Rose Central Academy official website
 Richard Rose sixth form 

Academies in Cumbria
Schools in Carlisle, Cumbria
Secondary schools in Cumbria
United Learning schools